Serhiy Mykolayovych Borysenko (born 17 April 1974 in Cherkasy) is a former Ukrainian football player.

Honours
Slovan Bratislava
Slovak Super Liga champion: 1998–99
Slovak Cup winner: 1998–99

References

1974 births
Sportspeople from Cherkasy
Living people
Ukrainian footballers
FC Dnipro Cherkasy players
FC Zirka Kropyvnytskyi players
Ukrainian Premier League players
FC CSKA Kyiv players
ŠK Slovan Bratislava players
Slovak Super Liga players
Ukrainian expatriate footballers
Ukrainian expatriate sportspeople in Slovakia
Ukrainian expatriate sportspeople in Russia
Expatriate footballers in Slovakia
FC Spartak Vladikavkaz players
Russian Premier League players
Expatriate footballers in Russia
SC Tavriya Simferopol players
FC Enerhetyk Burshtyn players
FC Spartak Ivano-Frankivsk players
FC Kryvbas Kryvyi Rih players
FC Prykarpattia Ivano-Frankivsk (2004) players
Association football forwards